The Huddersfield Cricket League is the premier cricket competition in Huddersfield, West Yorkshire, England.

The league has been in existence since 1891 with teams representing suburbs of Huddersfield and villages in the Huddersfield district area. There are now 41 teams in the league. Now there are teams from South Yorkshire and Saddleworth, as well as clubs that have joined the league from the now defunct Huddersfield Central Cricket League and former Central Yorkshire Cricket League.

A number of local players have come from the Huddersfield League to play for in the English County Championship, mainly for Yorkshire and have gone on to represent England. Other county players and international players have played club cricket in the Huddersfield League.

Member clubs

The league currently, as of 2021, is split into 7 sections, where club's first and second teams play.

Elland has had the most 1st XI competitions, leagues and various cups, with 42 trophies in the history of the league. Broad Oak with 32 trophies have had most success in 2nd XI competitions. 

Here are the clubs playing in the league during the 2021 season (they are linked to the locality where they are based):

 Almondbury 
 Almondbury Wesleyans
 Armitage Bridge
 Barkisland
 Birkby Rose Hill
 Broad Oak
 Cartworth Moor
 Clayton West
 Cumberworth United
 Delph & Dobcross
 Denby
 Denby Dale
 Edgerton & Dalton
 Elland
 Emley Clarence
 Flockton
 Golcar
 Hall Bower
 Holmbridge
 Holmfirth
 Honley

 Hoylandswaine
 Kirkheaton
 Kirkburton
 Lascelles Hall
 Lepton Highlanders
 Linthwaite
 Marsden
 Meltham
 Mirfield
 Mirfield Parish Cavaliers
 Moorlands CC
 Rastrick
 Scholes
 Shelley
 Shepley
 Skelmanthorpe
 Slaithwaite
 Thongsbridge
 Thurstonland
 Upperthong

Former clubs
 Bradey Mills
 Cawthorne
 Friarmere
 Halifax
 Huddersfield
 Kexborough
 Linthwaite Hall
 Lockwood
 Meltham Mills
 Micklehurst
 Paddock
 Primrose Hill

Notable players
Many Huddersfield Cricket League players have gone on to play First-class and Test cricket.

Almondbury
 Eddie Leadbeater (1927–2011) – Yorkshire Warwickshire and England

Almondbury Wesleyans
 Gurman Randhawa - Durham

Armitage Bridge
 Schofield Haigh – Yorkshire and England
 Robert Moorhouse – Yorkshire
 Fred Moorhouse – Warwickshire

Broad Oak 

 Charlie Roebuck - Yorkshire 
 Steven Crook - Lancashire, Northamptonshire, Middlesex
 Gurman Randhawa - Durham 
 Tony Palladino - Derbyshire 
Henry Cooper- Northern Districts and New Zealand A

Cawthorne  

 Nathan Buck - Northamptonshire 

Delph & Dobcross
 Arron Lilley – Lancashire
 Kyle Hogg – Lancashire
 Michael Smethurst – Lancashire

Elland
 Richard Blakey – Yorkshire and England
 Ajmal Shahzad – Yorkshire, Lancashire, Nottinghamshire and England

Emley Clarence
 Matthew Wood – Yorkshire

Golcar
 Arnie Sidebottom – Yorkshire and England

Holmfirth
 Allan Lamb – Northamptonshire and England
 Arnie Sidebottom – Yorkshire and England
 Ryan Sidebottom – Yorkshire, Nottinghamshire and England
 Tom Craddock – Essex
 Max Morley – Durham (Max is more commonly known for winning the ITV 'Love Island' television programme in 2015)

Honley
 Arnie Sidebottom – Yorkshire and England
 Craig White – Yorkshire and England
 Matthew Wood – Yorkshire
 Steven Crook – Lancashire, Northamptonshire, Middlesex

Hoylandswaine
 Ryan Robinson – Durham
 Alex Morris – Yorkshire, Hampshire
 Zac Morris – Hampshire
 Richard Wilkinson – Yorkshire

Kirkheaton
 George Hirst – Yorkshire and England
 Wilfred Rhodes – Yorkshire and England

Lascelles Hall
 Arnie Sidebottom – Yorkshire and England
 Matthew Wood – Yorkshire

Lepton Highlanders
 Phil Mustard – Durham and England

Linthwaite
 Barrie Leadbeater – Yorkshire (umpire)
 Chris Schofield – Lancashire, Surrey and England

Meltham
 Ryan Sidebottom – Yorkshire, Nottinghamshire and England
 Neil Carter – Warwickshire

Paddock
 Chris Balderstone – Yorkshire, Leicestershire and England
 Percy Holmes – Yorkshire and England
 Willie Watson – Yorkshire, Leicestershire and England.

Primrose Hill
 Ken Taylor – Yorkshire and England

Scoles
 Peter Drysdale – Northern Districts

Shelley
 Matthew Friedlander – Northamptonshire, Boland
 Mohammed Azharullah – Northamptonshire

Shepley
 Darren Gough – Yorkshire, Essex and England

Skelmanthorpe
 Ronnie Irani – Lancashire, Essex and England

Overseas professionals
Most of the teams have had professional players who have come from overseas. A few notable ones include:

Barkisland
 Tinashe Panyangara – Zimbabwe
 Tim Seifert - New Zealand

Broad Oak
 Vikram Rathour - India 
 Amay Khurasiya - India 

Golcar
 Atul Bedade – India
 Sonny Ramadhin (guest) – West Indies

Holmfirth
 Tony Gray – West Indies
 Andrew Hudson – South Africa

Honley
 Ian Harvey (guest) – Australia

Kirkheaton
 Andrew Hudson – South Africa

Linthwaite
 Deighton Butler – West Indies
 Vikram Rathour – India

Lascelles Hall
 Garth Le Roux – South Africa

Marsden
 Atul Wassan – India
 Abdur Rehman – Pakistan

Meltham
 Dilip Doshi – India
 Madan Lal – India
 Shahid Mahmood – Pakistan

Paddock
 Mansoor Akhtar – Pakistan
 Gary Sobers (guest) – West Indies
   Rastrick
    Amir Sohail   Pakistan 
    Asif Afridi   Pakistan 
Scholes
 Wasim Jaffer – India

Shelley
 Muthumudalige Pushpakumara – Sri Lanka
 Mohammad Ramzan – Pakistan

Shepley
 Trent Copeland – Australia

Slaithwaite
 Pragyan Ojha – India

References

External links
 Huddersfield Cricket League website
 The Cricket History of Calderdale and Kirklees – find out about Histories of many of the Drakes League teams

English domestic cricket competitions
Cricket in West Yorkshire